Miners for Democracy was a dissident movement within the United Mine Workers of America which successfully challenged the administration of the union in the early 1970s. It was organized in Clarksville, Pennsylvania in April 1970 after the assassination there of Joseph ‘‘Jock’’ Yablonski. MFD's action led to the election of Arnold Miller as UMWA's president from 1972 to 1979.

Reference

United Mine Workers of America
Trade union reform movements
1970 establishments in Pennsylvania